Bulengera is a commune of the city of Butembo in North Kivu, Democratic Republic of the Congo.

Butembo
Democratic Republic of Congo geography articles needing translation from French Wikipedia
Communes of the Democratic Republic of the Congo